Bastiglia is a comune (municipality) in the Province of Modena in the Italian region Emilia-Romagna, located about  northwest of Bologna and about  northeast of Modena.  

Bastiglia borders the following municipalities: Bomporto, Modena, and Soliera.

References

External links
 Official website

Cities and towns in Emilia-Romagna